Buckskin Joe, Colorado may refer to:

Buckskin Joe, Fremont County, Colorado
Buckskin Joe, Park County, Colorado

See also
Buckskin Joe